The Life of Stuff is a play by Simon Donald. It premiered at the Traverse Theatre in Edinburgh in 1993 before transferring to the Donmar Warehouse in London.

A movie version in 1997 was directed by Donald himself and starred Gina McKee and Ciarán Hinds. In 2013, it was revived at the Theatre503 in Battersea, London.

Awards and nominations
 Evening Standard: Most Promising Playwright Award (winner)
 Critic's Choice: Best New Play Award (winner)
 Olivier Awards: Best New Comedy (nominee)

References

British plays
1993 plays